Joseph Agassi (7 May 1927 – 22 January 2023) was an Israeli academic with contributions in logic, scientific method, and philosophy. He studied under Karl Popper and taught at the London School of Economics.

Agassi taught in the Department of Philosophy of the University of Hong Kong from 1960 to 1963. He later taught at the University of Illinois, Boston University, and York University in Canada.  He had dual appointments in the last positions with Tel Aviv University.

Personal life and death
He was married to Judith Buber Agassi – Martin Buber's granddaughter – from 1949 until her death in 2018. Together they had two children, Aaron, and Tirzah, who died of cancer in March 2008. Agassi resided in Herzliya, Israel. Tirzah's name, when she was a child, was often used by Popper in his dictum "Write it for Tirzah!" to explain his view that everyone has the duty to write in a clearly and easily understandable language. Agassi died on 22 January 2023, at the age of 95.

Philosophy 
Agassi's prime interest was in science, metaphysics, and politics. He took it that philosophy is nothing if not rationalist. For over fifty years he studied the rationality of science, metaphysics, and democratic politics.

An advocate of Popper's philosophy with variations, Agassi ignored many of the problems that concern some philosophers of science, chiefly that of theory choice. The problems of the philosophy of technology engaged him, including the problem of choosing scientific theories and ideas worthy of application and implementation.

Israeli politics 
Agassi had expressed criticism against the settler movement and advocated for Israel to "separate" from the worldwide Jewish community:

Global politics 
Agassi had written widely on global politics and on the methodology to implement global politics. His methodology was consistently procedural, without having requests for systematic procedures. His demands from those who design global politics are minimalist: small methodological changes may lead to large-scale achievements.

Agassi also proposed to bring global problems to public agendas for discussions in different forums, in particular in workshops where discussions are held with an agreed-upon agenda: the agenda, said Agassi, should be discussed and set by the participants prior to the discussion.

Publications

Books in English 
 Towards an Historiography of Science, History and Theory, Beiheft 2, 1963; facsimile reprint, Middletown: Wesleyan University Press, 1967.
 The Continuing Revolution: A History of Physics From The Greeks to Einstein, New York: McGraw Hill, 1968.
 Faraday as a Natural Philosopher, Chicago, Chicago University Press, 1971.
 Science in Flux, Boston Studies in the Philosophy of Science, Dordrecht, Reidel, 28, 1975. 
 (with Yehuda Fried) Paranoia: A Study in Diagnosis, Boston Studies in the Philosophy of Science, 50, 1976.
 Towards a Rational Philosophical Anthropology, The Hague: Martinus Nijhoff, 1977.
 Science and Society: Studies in the Sociology of Science, Boston Studies, 65, 1981.
 (with Yehuda Fried) Psychiatry as Medicine, Dordrecht: Kluwer, 1983.
 Technology: Philosophical and Social Aspects, Dordrecht: Kluwer, 1985.
 The Gentle Art of Philosophical Polemics: Selected Reviews and Comments, LaSalle IL: Open Court, 1988.
 (with Nathaniel Laor) Diagnosis: Philosophical and Medical Perspectives, Dordrecht: Kluwer, 1990.
 The Siblinghood of Humanity: Introduction to Philosophy, Delmar NY: Caravan Press, 1990, 1991.
 Radiation Theory and the Quantum Revolution, Basel: Birkhäuser, 1993.
 A Philosopher's Apprentice: In Karl Popper's Workshop, Series in the Philosophy of Karl R. Popper and Critical Rationalism, Amsterdam and Atlanta GA: Editions Rodopi, 1993. Second edition, 2008. Contents
 Liberal Nationalism for Israel: Towards an Israeli National Identity, Jerusalem and New York: Gefen. Translation from the Hebrew book of 1984.
 Science and Culture, Boston Studies in the Philosophy of Science, 231, 2003.
 (with I. C. Jarvie) A Critical Rationalist Aesthetics, Series in the Philosophy of Karl R. Popper and Critical Rationalism, Amsterdam: Rodopi, 2008. 
 (with Abraham Meidan) Philosophy from a Skeptical Perspective, NY and Cambridge: Cambridge University Press, 2008.
 Science and Its History: A Reassessment of the Historiography of Science, Boston Studies in the Philosophy of Science, 253, 2008. (This includes a corrected reprint of Towards an Historiography of Science, History and Theory)

Books in Hebrew 
 Letters to My Sister Concerning Contemporary Philosophy, Omer: Sarah Batz, 1976 1977. New enlarged edition, Tel-Aviv, Yedioth Aharonoth Books and Chemed Books, 2000.
 (with Dov Rappel) Philosophy of Education: A Philosophical Dialogue, Israeli Ministry of Defense, 1979.
 Between Faith and Nationality: Towards an Israeli National Identity, Tel-Aviv: Papirus, Tel-Aviv University, 1984. Second Edition, Revised and enlarged, 1993. English translation, 1999.
 (with Moshe Berent, and Judith Buber Agassi), Israeli National Awareness, Discussion Paper No. 11–88, 1988. Sapir Center for Development, Tel-Aviv University.
 Albert Einstein: Unity and Diversity, Israeli Ministry of Defense, 1989, 1994, and 2000.
 The Philosophy of Technology, Israeli Ministry of Defense, 1990.
 J. A., Judith Buber Agassi and Moshe Berent, Who is an Israeli? Rehovot: Kivunim, 1991. A variant of the Discussion Paper.
 The History of Modern Philosophy from Bacon to Kant (1600–1800): An Introduction. Tel-Aviv: Ramot, Tel-Aviv University, 1993 and reprints.
 An Introduction to Modern Philosophy, Israeli Ministry of Defense, 1996.
 (With Yeshayahu Leibowitz) Chemi Ben-Noon, editor, Conversations Concerning the Philosophy of Science, Israeli Ministry of Defense, 1996.
 (With Yeshayahu Leibowitz) Chemi Ben-Noon, editor, The Limits of Reason: Thought, Science and Religion; Yeshayahu Leibowitz and Joseph Agassi in Conversation, Jerusalem: Keter, 1997.
 (with Abraham Meidan) Beg to Differ: The Logic of Disputes and Argumentation, Springer, 2016

Books in Italian 
 Scienza, metodolgia e societá, edited by Michael Segre, Roma: Luiss Edizioni, 2000. 186 pp.
 Michael Segre, Accademia e società, Conversazioni con Joseph Agassi, Rubbatino Editore, 2004, 129 pages.
 Joseph Agassi, La filosofia e l'individuo – Come un filosofo della scienza vede la vita, Di Renzo Editore, Roma, 2005

Books edited 
 Psychiatric Diagnosis: Proceedings of an International Interdisciplinary Interschool Symposium, Bielefeld Universität, 1978, Philadelphia: Balaban Intl. Science Service, 1981. 184 pp.
 (With Robert S. Cohen), Scientific Philosophy Today: Essays in Honor of Mario Bunge, Boston Studies in the Philosophy of Science, 67, 1982. 503 pp.
 (With I. C. Jarvie), Rationality: The Critical View, Dordrecht: Kluwer, 1987. xi+462 pp.
 Hebrew Translation of Karl Popper's The Open Society and Its Enemies, Jerusalem, Shalem Publications, forthcoming, 2005.

Online papers 

A Note on Smith's Term "Naturalism" 
Anthropomorphism in Science 
Brainwashing 
Bye Bye Weber 
Can Adults Become Genuinely Bilingual? 
Causality and Medicine 
Deception: A View from the Rationalist Perspective 
Deconstructing Post-Modernism: Gellner and Crocodile Dundee 
Dissertation without tears 
Halakha and Agada 
Israeli Judaism 
Jacob Katz on Jewish Social History 
Karl Popper 
Leibniz's Place in the History of Physics 
Let a Thousand Flowers Bloom: Popper's Popular Critics 
Liberal Forensic Medicine 
Liberal Nationalism for Israel 
Liberal Nationalism (Chapters from the book in Russian) 
Movies Seen Many Times 
Neo-Classical Economics as 18th Century Theory of Man 
One Palestine 
On the Limits of Scientific Explanation: Hempel and Evans-Pritchard 
On the open grave of Hillel Kook 
Prescriptions for Responsible Psychiatry 
Quanta in Context 
Rights and Reason 
Science Education Without Pressure 
Scientific Literacy 
Summary of AFOS Workshop, 1994 
Tautology and Testability in Economics 
Technology: Philosophical and Social Aspects  The Gro
Brundtland Report (1987) Or, The Logic of Awesome Decisions 
The Heuristic Bent 
The Interface of Philosophy and Physics 
The Ivory Tower and the Seat of Power 
The Lakatosian Revolution 
The Last Refuge of the Scoundrel 
The Novelty of Chomsky's Theories 
Theoretical Bias in Evidence: a Historical Sketch 
The Philosophy of Science Today 
The Role of the Philosopher among the Scientists: Nuisance or Necessity? 
The Theory and Practice of the Welfare State 
To Save Verisimilitude 
Training to Survive the Hazard Called Education 
Variations on the Liar's Paradox 
Verisimilitude 
Who Discovered Boyle's Law?

References

External links

 Home page

1927 births
2023 deaths
People from Herzliya
Academics of the London School of Economics
Israeli philosophers
Scientists from Jerusalem
Popper scholars
Critical rationalists
Israeli expatriates in the United Kingdom